The Gallant Lords of Bois-Doré (Les Beaux Messieurs de Bois-Doré)  is a 1976 French television serial based on the 1857 historical novel by George Sand directed by Bernard Borderie. Along with the films about Angélique it is considered one of the most successful works of this director.

Synopsis
The serial consists of 5 parts. The first part introduces Sylvain, Marquis of Bois-Doré, a companion-in-arms of late king Henry IV of France. Following his sovereign the marquis had to  abjure his Calvinist faith and adopt Catholicism though he secretly sympathizes with Protestants. After the king's death he retired and went to his castle of Bois-Doré. The marquis feels deep love for Lauriane de Beuvre, a daughter of his friend and neighbour, 30 years younger than him. Guillaume d'Ars, Sylvain's cousin, introduces to him a certain Villaréal, a  Spanish nobleman.

The second part concentrates on relations between Bois-Doré, Lauriane, and Villaréal. The latter has found out that the marquis hides in the castle treasures of Protestants and begins to search for them. Besides Villareal  pays his addresses to Lauriane. Bois-Doré challenges him to a duel and kills him.

The third part tells about Mario, an 18 old youth whom the marquis saved from mercenaries. Mario has striking resemblance to marquis's brother who was lost 18 years ago. Bois-Doré finds evidence of Mario being his nephew and proclaims him an heir to his title and estate. The handsome boy wins Lauriane's affection.

The fourth part focuses on relations between Bois-Doré, Lauriane, and Mario. The latter falls in love with Lauriane whose heart is torn by sincere respect for noble, generous but elderly Sylvain and affection to young Mario.

The fifth part tells about hostilities between France and Spain, in which Sylvain and Mario take an active part.  Mario has been severely wounded in action and Lauriane realizes that she cannot live without him.

Reviews
The serial is distinguished by an entertaining plot, superb acting of G.Marchal (Sylvain) and Y. Folliot (Lauriane), picturesque scenery, and accurate representation of historical background.

“This is an eventful yarn, involving many subplots, it is par excellence the perfect swashbuckler, which after being popular in the first part of the sixties in the French theaters became mini-series in the seventies..”

Cast
 Georges Marchal     —	 Sylvain de Bois Doré
 Yolande Folliot     —	 Lauriane de Beuvre
 Michel Albertini    —	 Mario de Brion de Bois Doré
 Michel Creton	     —  Skiara d'Alminar Villaréal 
 Philippe Lemaire    —  Adamas
 François Maistre    —  Poulain
 Jean-François Poron —  Guillaume d'Ars
 Jean Martinelli     —  M. de Beuvre
 Marion Game	      —  Belinde / Prosperine 
 Olivier Hussenot    —  Jovelin
 Patrick Préjean     —  La Fleche

References

External links
 Les Beaux Messieurs de Bois Doré at the Institut national de l'audiovisuel (INA)

1976 French television series debuts
1977 French television series endings
1970s French television miniseries
France Télévisions original programming
France 2
Adaptations of works by George Sand
Television shows based on French novels
Historical television series
Television series set in the 17th century
French-language television shows